Moore Creek is a creek in South Algonquin, Nipissing District in Northeastern Ontario, Canada. It is in the Saint Lawrence River drainage basin and is a left tributary of the Madawaska River.

Hydrology
Pastwa Creek from Pastwa Lake enters as a left tributary at Moore Lake itself. The Madawaska River flows via the Ottawa River to the Saint Lawrence River.

The creek is entirely in South Algonquin, Nipissing District, but part of the drainage basin, like the southern end of McKenzie Lake and some other tributaries flowing from the south, is in Hastings Highlands, Hastings County.

Tributaries
Pastwa Creek (left)
Coghlan Creek (right)

See also
List of rivers of Ontario

References

Sources

Rivers of Nipissing District